Marek Kulas (born 6 July 1963) is a Polish former racing cyclist. He won the Tour de Pologne 1986.

References

External links

1963 births
Living people
Polish male cyclists
People from Kościerzyna
Sportspeople from Pomeranian Voivodeship